Valery Alexandrovich Kipelov (Russian: Валерий Александрович Кипелов; born July 12, 1958) is a Russian musician and composer who was the vocalist and a founding member of heavy metal band Aria. Since 2002, Kipelov leads his own metal band, Kipelov. In January 2023, Ukraine imposed sanctions on Valery for his support of 2022 Russian invasion of Ukraine.

Early life
Kipelov was born in 1958 in Kapotnya, Moscow, Soviet Union.

Career

Aria
Kipelov was among the founding members of Aria, alongside Vladimir Holstinin and Alik Granovsky, although he initially played a less active role in songwriting and the development of the band's style than the other two. For the first four albums, he only composed three songs (two of them slow ballads).. After the breakup in 1987, Kipelov and Holstinin were the only two members who remained with their producer Vekshtein. 

During the Germany tour 1994, Kipelov's relations with Holstinin and Dubinin became tense. He ceased appearing at Aria's studio and was fired from the band. Then Mavrin refused to play without Kipelov and left the band, too. After participating in a few of Master's concerts, Kipelov tried to form a band of his own, but later returned to Aria following the threat from Moroz Records to sue the band for breach of contract.

In 2002, after the release of 'Himera', Kipelov refused to start recording the new album, already written by Dubinin and Holstinin. He stated his wish to start a solo career.This disagreement broke Aria apart after 'Judgement Day', August 31, 2002.

Kipelov (band)

On September 1, 2002, the day after Kipelov left Aria, Kipelov, Terentyev, Mavrin and Maniakin launched a new band named Kipelov (named at Terentyev's suggestion as the bandmembers couldn't come up with any better name). In 2003, they released the live album Put Naverh (Way to the Top), recorded in Saint Petersburg.

Personal life
Kipelov is married to Galina Kipelova.

Kipelov expressed support of Russia's annexation of Crimea, and said it should've been returned to Russia in 1991. He performed at music festivals celebrating the event in Crimea. In July 2022, Kipelov  performed in the hospital in front of the Rosgvardiya servicemen wounded during the war in Ukraine.

He is Orthodox Christian.

References

1958 births
Living people
Russian heavy metal singers
20th-century Russian male singers
20th-century Russian singers
Russian rock singers
Aria (band) members
Singers from Moscow
21st-century Russian male singers
21st-century Russian singers